Person to Person was an Australian television series that aired from 1959 to 1960. It was an interview show, hosted by Bob Sanders and aired on ATN-7. Sanders interviewed people of topical interest.

References

External links
Person to Person on IMDb

Black-and-white Australian television shows
1959 Australian television series debuts
1960 Australian television series endings
Australian television talk shows
English-language television shows